Scopula pulchellata is a moth of the family Geometridae. It is found in the Indo-Australian tropics, from India, Sri Lanka to Taiwan and the Solomon Islands, as well as in Africa.

Description
Its wingspan is about 24 mm. Hindwings with more or less angled outer margin at vein 4. ochreous white colored moth. Frons fuscous. Forewings with a discocellular speck. Indistinct obliquely waved fuscous antemedial and medial lines, the latter on hindwing embracing the black discocellular spot. Both wings with waved postmedial line, with fuscous marks beyond it above middle of forewings and above inner margin of each wing. There is a sub-marginal fuscous marks series and a marginal black specks series.

Subspecies
Scopula pulchellata pulchellata
Scopula pulchellata rufinubes (Warren, 1900)
Scopula pulchellata semperi Prout, 1938
Scopula pulchellata takowensis Prout, 1938

References

Moths described in 1794
pulchellata
Moths of Asia
Moths of Africa